Zoë Poledouris (born August 25, 1973) also known as Zoë Roché since her marriage, is an American actress, musician, and film composer. She is the daughter of the film composer Basil Poledouris.

Filmography

External links

References

1973 births
American women composers
American film score composers
American people of Greek descent
Women film score composers
Living people
21st-century American women musicians